Phenacomargarites williamsae is a species of sea snail, a marine gastropod mollusk, in the family Calliostomatidae within the superfamily Trochoidea, the top snails, turban snails and their allies.

Description
The length of the shell attains 22.1 mm.

Distribution
This marine species occurs off the Solomon Islands

References

Calliostomatidae
Molluscs described in 2016